Nikolay Yefimovich Kruchina (14 May 192826 August 1991), was a top Soviet communist official, the administrator of affairs of the Central Committee of the Communist Party of the Soviet Union (CPSU) since 1983 and until his death, effectively the party's chief treasurer, responsible for its enormous assets (popularly dubbed as the party's gold) estimated to be worth nearly $9 billion, which have never been located since.

Career 
Born in Siberian Krai (now Altai Krai), Kruchina joined the party in 1949. In 1962 he became an instructor for the Agricultural Department of the CPSU. In 1963-1965 he was a secretary of the Tselinny Krai Committee of the Communist Party in the Kazakh SSR, in 1965-1978—the First Secretary of the Tselinograd Oblast Committee of the Communist Party in the Kazakh SSR. In 1973 he was awarded Hero of Socialist Labour. In 1971 Kruchina entered the Central Auditing Committee of the CPSU. In 1971 he became a candidate member and in 1976 a full member of the CPSU Central Committee. In 1978-1983 served as a first deputy chairman of the Agricultural Department of the CPSU then headed by Mikhail Gorbachev, became its chairman after Gorbachev in 1983 and in the same year, after Yuri Andropov's assumption of power, finally replaced Georgy Pavlov as the party's administrator of affairs (upravlyayushchiy delami). It is known that Kruchina's office transferred millions of dollars as a Soviet help to foreign Communist Parties. For the last time Kruchina visited his office on August 19, the day the abortive Soviet coup attempt of 1991 started. In 1966-1989 he was also a Deputy in the Supreme Soviet of the Soviet Union and in 1989-1991 People's Deputy of the Soviet Union.

Death 
Kruchina died as a result of falling out of the window of his apartment in Moscow in the early morning of August 26, five days after the coup attempt. Still, he allegedly left two suicide notes, where it was claimed that he was not a plotter, despite having never been publicly linked to the attempted coup. He apparently left near his desk on the armchair a thick file of recent Communist Party's illegal commercial operations. This wasn't the only alleged suicide among the Soviet leadership those days; Soviet Interior Minister Boris Pugo, one of the plotters, allegedly shot his wife and himself in their apartment on August 22, while Marshal Sergey Akhromeyev, Adviser to the President of the Soviet Union on military affairs, allegedly hanged himself in his office on August 24. On October 6, Kruchina's predecessor, Georgy Pavlov, fell to his death. On October 17, Dmitry Lisovolik, former deputy chief of the party's international department, was also found dead in the same manner several weeks after investigators found $600,000 in the office of his boss, Valentin Falin. Kruchina was laid to rest at the Troyekurovskoye Cemetery.

References

Further reading 
 Бунич, Игорь Львович. Золото Партии: Историческая хроника. – Санкт-Петербург: Шанс, 1992. P. 245–314.

External links 
 (in Russian)
 Черняев, А. 1990 год. Из дневников // НЛО 2007, No.84.

1928 births
1991 deaths
People from Altai Krai
Central Committee of the Communist Party of the Soviet Union members
Seventh convocation members of the Soviet of the Union
Eighth convocation members of the Soviet of the Union
Ninth convocation members of the Soviet of the Union
Tenth convocation members of the Soviet of the Union
Eleventh convocation members of the Soviet of the Union
Heroes of Socialist Labour
Recipients of the Order of Lenin
Recipients of the Order of the Red Banner of Labour
Soviet politicians who committed suicide
Suicides by jumping in Russia
Suicides in the Soviet Union
Burials in Troyekurovskoye Cemetery